Semyonovskaya is a rural locality (a village) in Lipetskoye Rural Settlement, Verkhovazhsky District, Vologda Oblast, Russia. The population was 22 as of 2002.

Geography 
Semyonovskaya is located 51 km southwest of Verkhovazhye (the district's administrative centre) by road. Leushinskaya is the nearest rural locality.

References 

Rural localities in Verkhovazhsky District